{{DISPLAYTITLE:C10H10N2O3}}
The molecular formula C10H10N2O3 (molar mass: 206.20 g/mol) may refer to:

 Caroxazone
 Imidazole salicylate
 Paraxazone

Molecular formulas